Vidny is a rural locality (a settlement) in Dobrinskoye Rural Settlement, Talovsky District, Voronezh Oblast, Russia. The population was 201 as of 2010.

Geography 
Vidny is located 24 km northeast of Talovaya (the district's administrative centre) by road. Abramovka is the nearest rural locality.

References 

Rural localities in Talovsky District